John Boyd Sears (November 26, 1869 – January 1, 1937) was an American politician who served as a member of the Virginia Senate.

References

External links
 
 

1869 births
1937 deaths
Democratic Party Virginia state senators
20th-century American politicians